Anotha Day Anotha Balla is the only studio album by American hip hop duo South Circle. It was released on July 4, 1995 through Suave House/Relativity Records. Recording sessions took place at Jus Fresh Recording Studio in Houston. Production was handled by Smoke One Productions, with James Endsley and Tony Draper serving as executive producers. It features guest appearances from 8Ball, Tela and MJG. The album was met with some success on the Billboard charts, peaking at number 63 on the Billboard 200 and number 8 on the Top R&B/Hip-Hop Albums. Two singles were released, "Attitudes" and "New Day", but neither made it to the Billboard charts.

Track listing

Sample credits
Track 8 contains a sample from "Attitudes" written by Allen Jones, James Alexander, Larry Dodson, Winston Stewart, Michael Beard, Charles Allen, Harvey Henderson, Lloyd Smith and Frank Thompson.

Personnel
Michael "Mr. Mike" Walls – main performer
Rex "Thorough" Robeson – main performer
Premro "8Ball" Smith – backing vocals
Winston "Tela" Rogers – backing vocals
Marlon "MJG" Goodwin – backing vocals
Smoke One Productions – producer
Clay "Jus Fresh" James – engineering, recording, mixing
Brian "Big Bass" Gardner – mastering
Tony "T-Money" Draper – executive producer, project coordinator
James Endsley – executive producer
Pen & Pixel – artwork, design

Charts

Weekly charts

Year-end charts

References

External links

1995 debut albums
South Circle albums
Relativity Records albums